Prasit Boonprasert (born 7 August 1956) is a Thai sprinter. He competed in the men's 4 × 100 metres relay at the 1984 Summer Olympics.

References

1956 births
Living people
Athletes (track and field) at the 1984 Summer Olympics
Prasit Boonprasert
Prasit Boonprasert
Place of birth missing (living people)
Asian Games medalists in athletics (track and field)
Prasit Boonprasert
Athletes (track and field) at the 1982 Asian Games
Medalists at the 1982 Asian Games
Prasit Boonprasert
Prasit Boonprasert